Li Youbin (born 15 February 1958) is a Chinese actor known for his roles in military dramas. He is particularly known for playing the role of Li Yunlong in the war drama Drawing Sword based on the eponymous novel by Chinese writer Duliang (都梁). In 2006, along with seven other actors, he received the Audience's Favorite Actor award at the Golden Eagle Awards.

Early life and education
Li was born into a family of workers in Kuancheng District of Changchun, Jilin, on February 15, 1958. He has four siblings. His elder sister Li Yeping is also an actress. Li attended the Changchun No. 11 High School.

Personal life
Li was twice married. He married actress Zhang Ruiqi in the 1980s, they had a son together, before they divorced in 2006.

Li began dating actress Shi Lanya in 2003 after they first met while appearing in Chinese drama Jiang Shan. They married in 2008.

Filmography

Film

Television

References

External links
 

1958 births
Chinese male film actors
Chinese male television actors
Male actors from Changchun
Living people